Marguerite Arosa (1852/4–1903) was a French portrait, landscape and genre painter and draughtswoman in 19th-century Paris.

Life 
Marguerite Arosa, the youngest daughter of the art collector Gustave Arosa, was born in Paris in 1852 or 1854. The family was of Spanish extraction. She studied under Mayer, Barrias and Armand-Gautier, and exhibited regularly at the Paris Salon between 1882 and 1900. She died in the 17th arrondissement of Paris on 23 February 1903.

Works 
Among her words were coastal landscapes: Temps brumeux, in the Salon of 1891; La pêche à la Senne (Brittany), in the Salon of 1897; and Coin de port à marée basse, in the Salon of 1900. She also painted genre scenes: in the Salon of 1885 or 1886 she was represented with an Andromède standing chained to a rock, looking out to sea; and in the Brussels Salon of 1884 with a Baigneuse. The artist took part in the Exposition internationale de blanc et noir in 1892 with the watercolour Lilas en fleurs (Parc Monceau).

References

Sources 

 Bénézit, Emmanuel (1924). «Arosa (Marguerite)». In Dictionnaire critique et documentaire des peintres, sculpteurs, dessinateurs & graveurs de tous les temps et de tous les pays. Vol. 1. Paris: Ernest Gründ. p. 234.
 Diego, Estrella de (1987). La mujer y la pintura del XIX español : cuatrocientas olvidadas y algunas más. Madrid: Cátedra. pp. 197, 258, 260, 262, 266, 276, 284, 287.
 Duplatre-Debes, Brigitte (2007). «El exilio artístico de los pintores españoles e hispanoamericanos en el París finisecular». Actas del XVI Congreso de la Asociación Internacional de Hispanistas. p. 3.
 L'Ermite, Pierre (11 February 1902). «Exposition des femmes peintre et sculpteurs». La Croix. p. 1.
 Spiller, Monika (2022). "Arosa, Marguerite". In Beyer, Andreas; Savoy, Bénédicte; Tegethoff, Wolf (eds.). Allgemeines Künstlerlexikon - Internationale Künstlerdatenbank - Online. Berlin, New York: K. G. Saur. Retrieved 3 October 2022.
 Thieme, Ulrich; Becker, Felix (1908). «Arosa, Marguérite». In Allgemeines Lexikon der Bildenden Künstler von der Antike bis zur Gegenwart. Vol. 2. Leipzig: E. A. Seemann. p. 150.
 Van Houtven, Andrea (2007). «The model and photographer of the Portrait of a Woman submitted to the SFP in 1867 by Tessié du Motay and Maréchal". Études photographiques, no. 35.
 La Correspondencia de España, no. 9936. 5 June 1855. p. 3.
 Société Lyonnaise des Beaux Arts: Livret Officiel du Salon. Lyon: X. Jevain, 1898. p. 1896.
 «Acte de décès à Paris 17e, n° 460». p. 9/31. Archives de Paris. Retrieved 2 October 2022.
 "Arosa, Marguerite". Benezit Dictionary of Artists. Oxford Art Online. Retrieved 2 October 2022.
 "Margarita Arosa". Real Academia de la Historia. Retrieved 3 October 2022.
 "Margarita Arosa y Derolle. (Paris 1852 – Paris 1903)". Fernando Alcolea. Retrieved 3 October 2022.

1854 births
1903 deaths
19th-century French women artists